Three Girls from Rome (released as Girls of the Spanish Steps in the UK) is a 1952 Italian classic comedy drama film directed by Luciano Emmer.

Cast
Lucia Bosè as Marisa
Cosetta Greco as Elena
Liliana Bonfatti as Lucia
Renato Salvatori as Augusto
Marcello Mastroianni as Marcello
Mario Silvani as Alberto
Ave Ninchi as Marisa's mother
Leda Gloria as Elena's mother
Eduardo De Filippo as Vittorio
Anna Maria Gugliari as Leda
Giorgio Bassani as the Narrator

Remake
In 1998 there was a remake for RAI2 television, a miniseries starring Romina Mondello, Vittoria Belvedere and Alice Evans followed by a 180-minute movie Le Ragazze Di Piazza Di Spagna 2 a year later.

External links 
 

1952 films
1950s Italian-language films
Films set in Italy
1952 comedy-drama films
Italian black-and-white films
Films directed by Luciano Emmer
Italian comedy-drama films
1950s Italian films